Sabrina S. Sutherland is an American film producer, best known for her work with David Lynch.

Career 
Sutherland is known for being the long-time producing partner of David Lynch and for her work on Twin Peaks (1990), Inland Empire (2006), and Twin Peaks: The Return (2017). She is also working with him on an upcoming Netflix show. As an actress, she also had a small role in Twin Peaks: The Return.

In 2020 and 2021, Sutherland has managed and produced the David Lynch Theater channel on YouTube.

Filmography

Film

Television

References

External links
 

American women film producers
American women television producers
David Lynch
Living people
Year of birth missing (living people)